Ger Slattery is an Irish rugby union player. He plays as a Hooker. Slattery plays his club rugby with Young Munster in Division 1A of the Ulster Bank All-Ireland League.

Munster
Slattery made his senior Munster debut on 27 December 2013, coming on as a replacement against Connacht in the Pro12, having been a late call-up to the team after Damien Varley took ill. He scored a brace of tries in Munster's 36–8 win against Zebre on 15 February 2014.

Ireland
Slattery started for the Ireland Club XV that beat England Counties XV 30-20 on 8 February 2013, scoring a try during the game.

References

External links
ESPN Profile

Living people
Irish rugby union players
Munster Rugby players
Rugby union hookers
Young Munster players
Year of birth missing (living people)